is a series of role-playing video games for the Dreamcast, released in Japan. Its seven volumes were released on a bi-monthly basis in Japan from October 10, 2000, through October 10, 2001.

Story 
The story involves twelve characters, each of whom must overcome personal quests on their way to finding the other eleven while aided by a mysterious man named Bantross. Relying heavily on elemental weapons, equipment, and magic spells, the game features many common RPG elements such as dungeon-exploring, weapon-upgrading, and turn-based battles. After surmounting their personal battles the twelve heroes first face the terrible Bals, Dios' most powerful servant and then descend into the underworld to face Dios and resurrect Razin.

Reception 
IGN gave volume 1 a 7.9 score.

Gamespot gave volume 1 a score of 6.7.

Three reviewers for Famitsu DC reviewed volume 5, giving it scores of 7/7/7, for a total of 21 out of 30.

References

External links 
Moby Games Entry for Eldorado Gate 7

2000 video games
Capcom games
Dreamcast games
Dreamcast-only games
Japan-exclusive video games
Role-playing video games
Video games developed in Japan